The Archdeaconry of Surrey is the ecclesiastical officer in charge of the archdeaconry of Surrey, a subdivision of the Church of England Diocese of Guildford in the Province of Canterbury.

History
The whole archdeaconry was historically in the diocese of Winchester; the bishop of Winchester had a principal residence at Farnham Castle in Surrey. So the archdeacon was also rector of St Andrew's Church, Farnham and used Farnham as a centre from which to administer the churches in the area. On 1 May 1927 it was separated from the diocese of Winchester and became the diocese of Guildford. On 17 August 1928, the archdeaconry of Dorking was formed out of the archdeaconry of Surrey by Order in Council.

Today the archdeaconry is one of the two archdeaconries in Surrey, the other being the archdeaconry of Dorking. The archdeaconry of Surrey is further subdivided into deaneries, Aldershot, Cranleigh, Farnham, Godalming, Guildford and Surrey Heath.

List of archdeacons

High Medieval
Junior archdeacons in the Diocese of Winchester
bef. 1107–aft. 1128: Stephen
bef. 1148–aft. 1148: William
Archdeacons of Surrey
bef. 1158–aft. 1158: Ralph
bef. 1159–aft. 1178: Robert de Inglesham (also Archdeacon of Gloucester, bef. 1187–aft. 1190)
bef. 1192–aft. 1215: Amicius
bef. 1215–aft. 1216: Peter
bef. 1238–aft. 1205: Geoffrey
bef. 1228–aft. 1243: Luke
bef. 1245–1258 (res.): Walter Branscombe (became Bishop of Exeter)
bef. June–June 1258 (abd.): Peter de Sancto Mauro (left England)
20 January 1259–bef. May 1261 (deprived): Oliver de Tracy (deprived by the pope)
aft. June 1262–18 March 1264 (deprived): Richard de Sancto Gorono (deprived by the pope)
18 March 1264–aft. 1295: Peter de Sancto Mauro (restored by the pope)
11 November 1296–bef. 1301 (d.): Thomas de Skerning

Late Medieval
12 March 1301–aft. 1317: Philip de Barton
10 April 1320–bef. 1347 (d.): William Inge
1347–bef. 1351 (res.): Richard Vaghan
1350: Raymond Pelegrini (mistaken appointment)
9 October 1351–bef. 1397 (d.): John de Edington
17 July 1397–bef. 1410 (d.): John Campeden
12 November 1410 – 27 April 1414 (res.): John Catterick (became Bishop of St David's)
13 August 1414–aft. 1429: John Forrest
bef. 1446–1447 (res.): John De la Bere (became Bishop of St David's)
5 January 1448–aft. 1478: John Waynflete or Paten
?–bef. 1482 (res.): Lionel Woodville (became Bishop of Salisbury)
31 March 1482 – 1500 (d.): Oliver Dynham
16 May 1500–aft. 1502: Christopher Bainbridge (Dean of York from 1503)
bef. 1509–aft. 1512: Matthew Long
?–22 March 1519 (res.): John Fox
27 March 1519 – 28 November 1521 (d.): William Rokeby, Archbishop of Dublin
13 May 1522 – 1530 (res.): John Stokesley (became Bishop of London)
14 July 1530 – 1531 (res.): Edward Lee (became Archbishop of York)
December 1531–18 December 1555 (exch.): Thomas Baghe

Early modern
18 December 1556–bef. 1559 (deprived): Edmund Mervin (deprived)
16 November 1559 – 13 February 1573 (res.): John Watson (became Dean of Winchester)
13 February 1573–bef. 1574 (res.): Valentine Dale
23 July 1574–bef. 1580 (res.): William Wickham
11 March 1580–bef. 1605 (d.): James Cottington
18 October 1605 – 1616 (res.): Arthur Lake (became Bishop of Bath and Wells)
7 February 1617 – 2 April 1649 (d.): George Hakewill
1649–1660: Vacant (English Interregnum)
4 September 1660 – 16 July 1686 (d.): John Pearson (also Bishop of Chester from 1672)
23 July 1686–bef. 1689 (d.): Richard Oliver
20 September 1689 – 3 June 1710 (d.): Thomas Sayer
7 June 1710 – 1716 (res.): Edmund Gibson (became Bishop of Lincoln)
25 February 1716 – 1719 (res.): Hugh Boulter (became Bishop of Bristol)
12 December 1719 – 21 May 1725 (d.): Samuel Billingsley
31 May 1725 – 17 February 1753 (d.): Richard Furney
27 February 1753 – 25 September 1760 (d.): Thomas Thackeray
10 November 1760 – 9 March 1766 (d.): Thomas Ridding
17 March 1766 – 1769 (res.): Newton Ogle (became Dean of Winchester)
13 November 1769 – 1 April 1782 (res.): John Butler (also Bishop of Oxford from 1777)
2 April 1782 – 1 August 1814 (d.): John Carver
15 August 1814 – 8 September 1839 (d.): Thomas de Grey (Lord Walsingham from 1831)
20 November 1839–bef. 1845 (res.): Samuel Wilberforce (became Dean of Westminster)
21 May 1845 – 15 October 1847 (d.): William Dealtry
16 November 1847 – 30 November 1859 (res.): Charles Hoare

Late modern
aft. 1859–21 December 1879 (d.): John Utterton, Rector of Farnham, Bishop suffragan of Guildford (from 1874; father of Frank)
1880–9 March 1888 (d.): Peter Atkinson, Vicar of Dorking
1888–4 June 1906 (d.): John Sapte, Rector of Cranleigh
1906–19 April 1908 (d.): Frank Utterton, Vicar of Leatherhead (until 1907; son of John)
1908–1922 (res.): Albert Robinson, canon treasurer
1922–1936 (res.): Lionel Blackburne, Vicar of St Mark's, Portsmouth (until 1923), then Rector of Puttenham (1926–1927; became Dean of Ely)
In 1927, the Diocese of Guildford was erected, consisting of this archdeaconry.
In 1928, the archdeaconry of Dorking was split from Surrey archdeaconry.
1936–1949 (ret.): Cyril Golding-Bird, Assistant Bishop (previously Archdeacon of Dorking)
1949–1955 (ret.): Andrew Ritchie
October 1955–23 July 1957 (d.): Geoffry Smith
1957–1968 (ret.): Augustine Studdert, Rector of Busbridge (afterwards archdeacon emeritus)
1968–1980 (ret.): John Evans
1980–1989 (res.): Paul Barber (became Bishop suffragan of Brixworth)
1989–1995 (res.): John Went (became Bishop suffragan of Tewkesbury)
1996–2005 (res.): Bob Reiss
9 October 200519 September 2017 (ret.): Stuart Beake
10 December 2017present: Paul Davies

References

Sources

Edward Wedlake Brayley (1841), A Topographical History of Surrey

Further reading
 A. L. Browne, 'The early archdeacons of Surrey', Surrey Archaeol. Collections xlvi (1938) 68-97.
Brian Taylor (1992) The Archdeacons of Surrey: A Provisional Prosopography

Surrey
 
Archdeacon of Surrey